The Roman Catholic  Diocese of Coatzacoalcos (erected 14 March 1984) is a suffragan diocese of the Archdiocese of Jalapa.

Ordinaries
Carlos Talavera Ramírez (1984 -2002) 
Rutilo Muñoz Zamora (2002 - )

Episcopal See
Coatzacoalcos, Veracruz

External links and references

Coatzacoalcos
Coatzacoalcos, Roman Catholic Diocese of
Coatzacoalcos
Coatzacoalcos
1984 establishments in Mexico